Nikolay Chipev (born 20 February 1989) is a Bulgarian footballer.

Career
He was raised in CSKA Sofia's youth teams. In 2015, he signed a contract with FK Dinamo Samarqand to play in the Uzbek top division. Chipev made his official debut for Dinamo on 14 March in League home match against Kokand 1912. He scored his first goal for new club on 20 March 2015 in away match against FK Buxoro, scoring in the 29th minute. He was sent off on 19 June 2015, in the 0:2 away loss against Nasaf Qarshi.  On 8 November 2016, Chipev was released by Montana.

Honours
CSKA Sofia
 Bulgarian Supercup: 2008

References

External links
 

1989 births
Living people
Bulgarian footballers
First Professional Football League (Bulgaria) players
PFC CSKA Sofia players
PFC Beroe Stara Zagora players
FC Sportist Svoge players
PFC Lokomotiv Plovdiv players
Ħamrun Spartans F.C. players
FC Montana players
PFC Vidima-Rakovski Sevlievo players
PFC Slavia Sofia players
PFC Svetkavitsa players
Neftochimic Burgas players
PFC Spartak Varna players
FK Dinamo Samarqand players
Association football midfielders
Expatriate footballers in Malta
Expatriate footballers in Uzbekistan
Bulgarian expatriates in Malta